Keratin, type I cuticular Ha4 is a protein that in humans is encoded by the KRT34 gene.

The protein encoded by this gene is a member of the keratin gene family. As a type I hair keratin, it is an acidic protein which heterodimerizes with type II keratins to form hair and nails. The type I hair keratins are clustered in a region of chromosome 17q12-q21 and have the same direction of transcription.

See also
34βE12 (keratin 903)

References

Further reading